Mikael Severo Burkatt (born 26 April 1993), commonly known as Mikael, is a Brazilian footballer who currently plays as an attacking midfielder for Hong Kong Premier League club Kitchee.

Club career
On 10 August 2019, Mikael was named as a player for Hong Kong Premier League club Yuen Long.

On 3 June 2020, Happy Valley officially announced the signing of Mikael.

On 9 August 2021, it was announced that Mikael had joined Eastern. He left the club on 9 July 2022.

On 12 July 2022, it was announced that Mikael had joined Kitchee.

References

External links
 
 Mikael at HKFA

1993 births
Living people
Brazilian footballers
Brazilian expatriate footballers
Association football midfielders
Campeonato Brasileiro Série B players
Campeonato Brasileiro Série C players
Campeonato Brasileiro Série D players
Clube Esportivo Lajeadense players
Clube Esportivo Aimoré players
Boa Esporte Clube players
Esporte Clube Pelotas players
Uberlândia Esporte Clube players
Ypiranga Futebol Clube players
Esporte Clube Passo Fundo players
Clube do Remo players
Esporte Clube São Luiz players
Sociedade Esportiva e Recreativa Caxias do Sul players
América Futebol Clube (RN) players
Hong Kong Premier League players
Yuen Long FC players
Happy Valley AA players
Eastern Sports Club footballers
Kitchee SC players
Brazilian expatriate sportspeople in Hong Kong
Expatriate footballers in Hong Kong